The 300 North Los Angeles Street Federal Building, located across the street from the Edward R. Roybal Federal Building and United States Courthouse, is a federal building of the United States that opened in 1965 and is now on the National Register of Historic Places. The building is also notable as the site of a 1971 bombing that killed an 18-year-old worker.

Art and architecture 
The building hosts three glass mosaics by Los Angeles artist Richard Haines: Celebration of our Homeland, Recognition of All Foreign Lands, and Of the People, for the People, by the People. The building design was a collaboration between Welton Becket & Associates, Albert C. Martin & Associates, and Paul R. Williams & Associates. The building is part of Los Angeles Civic Center Historic District.

Bombing 
On January 28, 1971, at 4:30 p.m. PST, an explosion in the second floor men's room killed Thomas Ortiz of City Terrace, a teenage orderly employed by the Internal Revenue Service. The bomb ripped a four-foot hole through the wall. Both of Ortiz's legs were both blown off and he suffered "severe head injuries," dying en route to the hospital. The blast was powerful enough to shatter the washbasins in the bathroom and damage the washrooms on the floors above and below the bomb site. Three other bombs had been placed in Southern California government office buildings in January 1971; two had exploded, one did not. At the time of the 1974 LAX bombing it was noted that the FBI had not identified any suspects in the 1971 federal building bombing and the case remained open.

Access
   Civic Center/Grand Park station is located four blocks from 300 N. Los Angeles. The DASH Downtown D line also circulates past the building on a regular schedule.

See also
 List of Los Angeles federal buildings

References 

Building bombings in the United States
Federal buildings in Los Angeles
Buildings and structures in Downtown Los Angeles
Civic Center, Los Angeles
Government buildings in Los Angeles
Government buildings completed in 1965
1965 establishments in California
1960s architecture in the United States
1971 in Los Angeles
Explosions in 1971
1971 crimes
Attacks in the United States in 1971
1971 murders in the United States
Murder in Los Angeles